Thompson's Bottom is a hamlet in the North Kesteven district of Lincolnshire, England. The hamlet includes a farmstead.

Hamlets in Lincolnshire
North Kesteven District